Ryo Fujii (born 7 August 1996) is a Hong Kong-born Japanese professional footballer who plays as a defensive midfielder for Liga 1 club PSIS Semarang.

Early life and education 
Fujii was born 7 August 1996 in Hong Kong to a Japanese father and a Korean mother.  At a young age, Fujii and family relocated to Torrance, California, where he was raised.  Fujii attended South High School and played for the school's varsity team for all 4 years.  He joined and played with Chivas USA's youth side for the 2011–2012 U.S. Soccer Development Academy season before appearing with LA Galaxy's youth side for the 2013–2014 season.

With his background, Fujii was considered a top collegiate soccer prospect.  Fujii elected to attend the University of California, Santa Barbara after being recruited by head coach Tim Vom Steeg.  While there, he played college soccer as a member of the UC Santa Barbara Gauchos men's soccer team.  He appeared in 19 games for the Gauchos and added 2 assists.  He was named to the Big West Conference All-Freshman Team following the conclusion of the season.

Club career

LA Galaxy
In February 2015, Fujii turned professional by signing with LA Galaxy II of the United Soccer League.  By turning professional, he forfeited his amateur status and scholarship with UC Santa Barbara, but Fujii was the first player to sign for LA Galaxy under a new partnership with California State University that provided additional financial resources for schooling.  Jovan Kirovski, the one responsible for Fujii's path, is unaware of any previous similar agreements and that this may be the first of its kind.  During his first professional season, he made twelve appearances for LA Galaxy II with 1 assist.

Nyköpings BIS
On 1 March 2018, Fujii joined Nyköpings in Ettan Fotboll, the Swedish third tier.

Global F.C.
On 25 February 2020, Fujii reportedly signed a deal with the Philippines Football League club Global but the club was banned by the Philippine Football Federation before the season could start.

Kaya F.C.–Iloilo 
Philippines Football League club Kaya–Iloilo announced on 8 April 2021 that they have signed in Fujii.

PSIS Semarang 
After 1 month trial, Ryo Fujii was officially signed by PSIS Semarang to face the second round of 2022–23 Liga 1. Fujii made his professional debut on 16 January 2023 in a match against RANS Nusantara at the Pakansari Stadium, Bogor.

References

External links 
 LA Galaxy player profile
 
 UC Santa Barbara player profile
 

1996 births
Living people
UC Santa Barbara Gauchos men's soccer players
LA Galaxy II players
Nyköpings BIS players
Global Makati F.C. players
PSIS Semarang players
USL Championship players
Philippines Football League players
Liga 1 (Indonesia) players
Japanese expatriate footballers
Expatriate soccer players in the United States
Expatriate footballers in Sweden
Expatriate footballers in Indonesia
Japanese expatriate sportspeople in the United States
Japanese expatriate sportspeople in Sweden
Japanese expatriate sportspeople in Indonesia
Hong Kong people of Japanese descent
Japanese footballers
Association football midfielders
Japanese people of Korean descent